2011 in Korea may refer to:
2011 in North Korea
2011 in South Korea